Mirabad-e Rigan (also Romanized as Mīrābād-e Rīgān and Mīrābād Rīgān; also known as Mīrābād and Pīrābād) is a village in Rigan Rural District, in the Central District of Rigan County, Kerman Province, Iran. At the 2006 census, its population was 1,410, in 290 families.

References 

Populated places in Rigan County